Harold Jack Swarthout (February 23, 1920 – October 1, 2005) was an American college football player, coach, and administrator. He served as head football coach and athletic director at his alma mater, the University of Montana, from 1967 through 1975. Swarthout compiled an overall record of 51–41–1, winning Big Sky Conference championships in 1969 and 1970.

Swarthout played for the Grizzlies in the three seasons immediately prior to World War II as an undersized but exciting back, nicknamed "Rabbit." He graduated from Montana in 1942, served in the U.S. Army during the war, then coached high school football in Hoquiam, Washington.

Montana
In December 1966, Swarthout was hired as head football coach at Montana, following a 1–8 season under Hugh Davidson. Swarthout had been a college assistant coach under Darrell Royal and was the head coach at Olympia High School in Olympia, Washington.

Swarthout brought on Jack Elway as an assistant and together they led the Grizzlies to a much-improved 7–3 record in their first season and was named the Big Sky's coach of the year. (Elway was the quarterback at Hoquiam High School in the late 1940s under head coach Swarthout.) Within two years, Swarthout guided Montana to back-to-back undefeated regular seasons in 1969 and 1970, UM's first Big Sky Conference titles. Both years they were defeated by North Dakota State in the Camellia Bowl, which was part of a set of bowls that led up to a poll to determine the NCAA College Division national championship, prior to the current College Division playoff structure.

After the 1970 season, Swarthout was rumored as a candidate for head coach at Illinois in the Big Ten Conference, but he stayed with the Grizzlies. He was indicted in federal court in 1972 concerning the diversion of student-aid funds to the athletic department, but was acquitted in April 1973.

Swarthout stepped down as UM athletic director in July 1975, and after nine seasons as head football coach in Missoula, he departed in the summer of 1976. He returned to Olympia that fall to coach at Capital High School for the next decade.

Death
After a battle with non-Hodgkin lymphoma, Swarthout died at age 85 in Olympia.

Head coaching record

References

1920 births
2005 deaths
American football quarterbacks
American football halfbacks
Frankfurt Galaxy coaches
High school football coaches in Washington (state)
Montana Grizzlies and Lady Griz athletic directors
Montana Grizzlies football coaches
Montana Grizzlies football players
People from Benton County, Washington
People from Sunnyside, Washington
Texas Longhorns football coaches
Washington Huskies football coaches
People from Olympia, Washington
United States Army personnel of World War II